McCain may refer to:

 McCain (surname), a surname (includes a list of persons and characters)

Companies 
 McCain Foods Limited, a producer of frozen foods
 McCain, Inc., privately held American manufacturing company headquartered in Vista, CA
 McCain Institute, Washington, D.C.-based think tank

Places 
 McCain Bluff, in the Usarp Mountains of Antarctica
 McCain Furniture Store, historic building in downtown Columbia, Missouri, United States
 McCain Mall, enclosed shopping mall in North Little Rock, Arkansas, United States
 McCain Stadium, former sports stadium in Scarborough, England, United Kingdom

Other uses 
 USS John S. McCain, two ships of the United States Navy

See also 
 Cain, one of the sons of Adam and Eve
 Caine (disambiguation)
 McAnn, a surname